The Liberal Party (Filipino and Spanish: Partido Liberal), abbreviated as the LP, is a liberal political party in the Philippines.

Founded on January 19, 1946, by Senate President Manuel Roxas, Senate President Pro-Tempore Elpidio Quirino, and former 9th Senatorial District Senator José Avelino from the breakaway liberal wing of the old Nacionalista Party (NP), the Liberal Party remains the second-oldest active political party in the Philippines after the NP, and the oldest continually-active party. The LP served as the governing party of four Philippine presidents: Manuel Roxas, Elpidio Quirino, Diosdado Macapagal, and Benigno Aquino III. It subsequently served as a senior member of President Corazon Aquino's UNIDO coalition. Upon Corazon Aquino's death in 2009, the party regained popularity, winning the 2010 Philippine presidential election under Benigno Aquino III and returning it to government to serve from 2010 to 2016. This was the only instance the party had won the presidency since the end of the Marcos dictatorship, however, as it lost control of the office to Rodrigo Duterte of PDP–Laban in the 2016 presidential election and became the leading opposition party once again. Its vice presidential candidate Leni Robredo won in the same election, however, narrowly beating the second candidate by a small margin.

The Liberal Party was the political party of the immediate past Vice President of the Philippines. In the 2019 midterm elections, the party remained the primary opposition party of the Philippines, holding three seats in the Senate. The LP was the largest party outside of Rodrigo Duterte's supermajority, holding 18 seats in the House of Representatives after 2019. In local government, the party held two provincial governorships and five vice governorships. The general election of 2022, however, was a setback for the party, which lost both the Presidency and Vice-Presidency, as well as all of its seats in the Senate, and saw its representation in the House of Representatives reduced.

The Liberal Party remains an influential organization in contemporary Philippine politics. With centre-left positions on social issues and centrist positions on economic issues, it is commonly associated with the post-revolution, liberal-democratic status quo of the Philippines in contrast to authoritarianism, neoconservatism, and socialism. Aside from presidents, the party has been led by liberal thinkers and progressive politicians including Benigno Aquino Jr., Jovito Salonga, Raul Daza, Florencio B. Abad Jr., Franklin Drilon, and Mar Roxas. Two of its members, Corazon Aquino and Leila de Lima, have received the prestigious Prize For Freedom, one of the highest international awards for liberal and democratic politicians since 1985 given by Liberal International. The Liberal Party is a member of the Council of Asian Liberals and Democrats and Liberal International.

History

Founding 
The Liberal Party was founded on January 19, 1946, by Manuel Roxas, the first President of the Third Philippine Republic. It was formed by Roxas from what was once the "Liberal Wing" of the Nacionalista Party. Two more Presidents of the Philippines elected into office came from the LP: Elpidio Quirino and Diosdado Macapagal. Two other presidents came from the ranks of the LP, as former members of the party who later joined the Nacionalistas: Ramon Magsaysay and Ferdinand Marcos.

Martial law era 
During the days leading to his declaration of martial law, Marcos would find his old party as a potent roadblock to his quest for one-man rule. Led by Ninoy Aquino, Gerry Roxas and Jovito Salonga, the LP would hound President Marcos on issues like human rights and the curtailment of freedoms. Even after Marcos' declaration of martial law silenced the LP, the party continued to oppose the regime, and many of its leaders and members would be prosecuted and even killed during this time.

Post-EDSA 
After democracy was restored after the People Power Revolution, the LP was instrumental in ending more than half a century of US military presence in the Philippines with its campaign in the 1991 senate to reject a new RP-US Bases Treaty. This ironically cost the party dearly, losing for it the elections of 1992. In 2000, it was in opposition to the Joseph Estrada administration, actively supporting the Resign-Impeach-Oust initiatives that led to People Power II.

On March 2, members of the LP installed Manila Mayor Lito Atienza as the party president, which triggered an LP leadership struggle and party schism. The Supreme Court later proclaimed Drilon the true president of the party, leaving the Atienza wing expelled.

The Benigno Aquino III administration 
The Liberal Party regained influence when it nominated as its next presidential candidate then-Senator Benigno Aquino III, the son of former President Corazon Aquino, for the 2010 Philippine presidential election after the latter's death that subsequently showed a groundswell of support for his candidacy. Even though the party had earlier nominated Sen. Manuel "Mar" Roxas II to be its presidential candidate for the 2010 Philippine general election, Roxas gave way to Aquino and instead ran for vice president. The party was able to field new members breaking away from the then-ruling party Lakas–Kampi–CMD, becoming the largest minority party in Congress. Aquino would later win by plurality, and the LP would become the majority party in Congress.

2016–present 
In the 2016 presidential elections, the Liberal Party nominated Mar Roxas, former Department of Transportation and Communications (DoTC) and Department of the Interior and Local Government (DILG) secretary, and Leni Robredo, a representative from Naga City and widow of Jesse Robredo, the DILG secretary  who preceded Roxas, as the party's presidential and vice presidential candidates. Robredo won, while Roxas lost. Most of the party's members either switched allegiance to PDP–Laban, joined a supermajority alliance but retained their LP membership (with some defecting later), joined the "recognized minority", or created an opposition bloc called "Magnificent 7".

As early as February 2017, the leaders of the Liberal Party chose to focus on rebuilding the party by inviting sectoral representation of non-politicians in its membership numbers. Since then the party had been inducting new members who were non-politicians, some of whom applied online through the party's website, Liberal.ph. Before the scheduled 2019 general elections, the LP formed Otso Diretso, an electoral coalition of eight candidates for the senate race; led by the party, the coalition field also comprised members of the Magdalo Party-List, Akbayan Citizens Action Party, and Aksyon Demokratiko. None of the eight senatorial candidates under Otso Diretso won a seat, however; it was the first time in the history of the current bicameral composition of the Philippine Congress under the 1987 Constitution that the opposition failed to win a seat in one of the chambers, and the second time that a Liberal Party-led coalition suffered a great loss since 1955.

For the 2022 Philippine presidential election, the Liberal Party nominated Leni Robredo and Francis Pangilinan for the presidential and vice presidential posts, respectively.

Ideology 
While the Liberal Party defines its ideology as social liberalism, the party has often been described as a "centrist" or "liberal" party. Historically, the Liberal Party has been evaluated as a "conservative" party, with an ideology similar to or indistinguishable from the Nacionalista Party's ideology, until it became the opposition party under the Marcos Sr. dictatorship, wherein it became more liberal. Being a founding member of the Council of Asian Liberals and Democrats and a full member of Liberal International, the Liberal Party advocates the values of "freedom, justice and solidarity (bayanihan)," as described in the party's values charter.  Although this may be deemed theoretically true since the party's founding in 1946, it became more tangible through the party's position of continuing dissent during the Marcos dictatorship.

Since 2017, the party has opened party membership to the general public and to key sectors of society, aiming to harness a large volunteering base. According to the party, this aims to ostensibly build on "the promise of becoming a true people’s party".

Current political positions 
The party has declared policies geared toward inclusiveness and people empowerment. It also advocates and supports secure jobs, food, shelter, universal health care, public education access, and other social services, and is against extrajudicial killings, any challenge to the rule of law, and curtailments of human rights strictures. The party also aims to form an open government with participatory democracy, positions that have been supported by the party's recent leaders.

Economic policy
 Improve social safety nets.
 Impose 1% wealth tax on individuals with net value assets exceeding ₱1 billion.
 Create tax exemptions for selected products.
 Maximize the budget windfall of local governments for antipoverty projects.
 Increase minimum wages.
 Declare and address an "education crisis", increase the education budget to 6% of GDP, streamline teachers' function, and establish special education (SPED) centers in all public schools.
 Develop an inter-sectoral approach and convergence of roles for the attainment of a functioning universal health care, provide due fixed allowances and statutory benefits to barangay health workers, and fix the corruption in PhilHealth.
 Prioritize infrastructure for spurring rural development, transportation, water resource management, and climate resilience, funded through public-private partnerships rather than loans.
 Upgrade science and technology research and development funding and promote data-driven agriculture.
 Invest in subsidies to promote renewable energy and implement better waste disposal to mitigate sea pollution.
 Prioritize a job guarantee program and expand coverage of the SSS and Pag-Ibig.
 Promote financial literacy.
 Offer voucher programs for access to private colleges and universities.
 Enact a law calling for equal participation of women in the economy and in decision-making positions, both in public and private organizations.
 Addressing systemic corruption in government.
 Cleaner air and water and sustainable arable land as well as extensive programs against climate change.

Legal issues 
Senator Leila de Lima, who led an investigation into alleged extrajudicial deaths in the early months of Duterte's war on drugs, was issued an arrest warrant in 2017 based on charges linked to the New Bilibid Prison drug trafficking scandal, which the party claimed was based on trumped-up charges, labelling the arrest "patently illegal". While on the whole, de Lima's investigation was seen by some pundits as an adversarial investigation that was a strategic mistake, others in the party simply saw it as a call to a review of the party's principles and how members have adhered to them.

In 2019, the party, along with other groups, was accused of planning a coup against the Duterte government. The party denounced the allegation and called it a state-sponsored threat of legal abuse, demanding the government provide evidence to back the claims.

Current party officials
President: Albay Representative Edcel Lagman (2022–present)
Vice President: Former Quezon Representative Lorenzo Tañada III (2022–present)
Chairperson: Former Senator Francis Pangilinan (2022–present)
Vice Chairperson: Former Quezon City Representative Kit Belmonte (2022–present)
Secretary-General: Former Ifugao Representative Teddy Baguilat  (2022–present)
Treasurer: Oriental Mindoro Representative Alfonso Umali Jr. (2022–present)

Presidents

Electoral performance

Presidential elections

Vice presidential elections

Legislative elections

Senate

House of Representatives

Notable members

Philippine presidents
Manuel Roxas  (5th President of the Philippines; one of the co-founders) 
Elpidio Quirino (6th President of the Philippines) 
Diosdado Macapagal (9th President of the Philippines) 
Ferdinand Marcos Sr.  (10th President of the Philippines) – Marcos won in 1965 as the candidate of the Liberal Party's rival Nacionalista Party, the party to which Marcos defected after failing to get the LP nomination. 
Benigno Aquino III (15th President of the Philippines)
Rodrigo Duterte (16th President of the Philippines) – A former party chair in Davao City from 2009, Duterte left the party in 2015. He won the presidency in 2016 under the PDP-Laban ticket.

Philippine vice presidents
Leni Robredo  (14th vice president of the Philippines)

Others
List of Liberal Party (Philippines) members

Coalition
 Akbayan
 Katipunan ng Nagkakaisang Pilipino
 Magdalo
 Makabayan
 Partido Reporma

References

External links

Liberal International
Liberal parties in the Philippines
Social liberal parties
Political parties established in 1946
Centrist parties in the Philippines
Centre-left parties in Asia